The Scottish Government Finance Directorates are a group of  civil service Directorates in the Scottish Government created by a December 2010 re-organisation.

The individual Directorates within the overarching Finance Directorates report to the Director-General, Alyson Stafford CBE.

Ministers 
There is no direct relationship between Ministers and the Directorates. However, in general, the activities of the Directorates include those under the purview of the Cabinet Secretary for Finance and the Constitution.

Directorates
The overarching Scottish Government Directorates were preceded by similar structures called "Departments" that no longer exist (although the word is still sometimes used in this context). 

As an overarching unit, the  Finance Directorates incorporate the:

 Scottish Procurement and Commercial Directorate - Director: Alistair Merrill
 Legal Services Directorate - Director & Solicitor to the Scottish Government: Murray Sinclair
 Planning & Environmental Appeals Directorate - Director & Chief Reporter: Lindsey Nicoll
 Parliamentary Counsel Office - Director: Andy Beattie

History
Prior to the creation of the Finance Directorates in 2010, many of their responsibilities were undertaken by the Scottish Government Finance and Corporate Services Directorates and prior to 2007 by the Scottish Executive Finance and Central Services Department.

See also
 Scottish budget

References

External links
 Scottish Government Senior Management Structure from 2007-2010 (pdf)

Directorates of the Scottish Government
2010 establishments in Scotland
Government agencies established in 2010
Public finance of Scotland